Benleagh at , does not have the prominence to qualify as an Arderin, but its prominence does allow it to rank as the 125th–highest peak on the Vandeleur-Lynam scale.  Benlagh is situated in the southern sector of the Wicklow Mountains, and is part of the large massif of Lugnaquilla , Wicklow's highest mountain.

Benleagh's southern flank forms the steep walls and cliffs of the hanging valley of Fraughan Rock Glen, which then falls into the U-shaped valley of Glenmalure below; Benleagh forms a "horseshoe" around the Fraughan Rock Glen with Lugnaquillia at its apex and Cloghernagh , to the south.  Benleagh also sits on a broad "spine" that links Lugnaquilla in the south, to Camenabologue and Table Mountain to the north, which circle the Glen of Imaal.

Bibliography

Gallery

See also

Wicklow Way
Wicklow Round
Wicklow Mountains
Lists of mountains in Ireland
List of mountains of the British Isles by height

References

External links
MountainViews: The Irish Mountain Website, Benleagh
MountainViews: Irish Online Mountain Database
The Database of British and Irish Hills , the largest database of British Isles mountains ("DoBIH")
Hill Bagging UK & Ireland, the searchable interface for the DoBIH

Mountains and hills of County Wicklow
Mountains under 1000 metres